Jusuf "Musa" Hatunić (17 October 1950 – 11 May 1991) was a Yugoslav footballer from Bosnia.

Club career
He was a player of Yugoslav First League clubs Sloboda Tuzla (1969–1976) and FK Partizan (1976–1981), with short spells with Turkish club Galatasaray (1979) and Yugoslav Second League club FK Rad (1981–1983) where he ended his playing career.

His son Jusmir Hatunić played for Partizan and Rad as well but as a goalkeeper.

International career
He made his debut for Yugoslavia in a June 1972 friendly match against Venezuela and has earned a total of 8 caps, scoring no goals. His final international was a May 1978 friendly match against Italy.

Honours
Partizan
Yugoslav First League: 1977–78

References

External links
Player profile in Serbian Federation website

Images of Hatunić including obituary

1950 births
1991 deaths
People from Lukavac
Association football midfielders
Bosnia and Herzegovina footballers
Yugoslav footballers
Yugoslavia international footballers
FK Sloboda Tuzla players
FK Partizan players
Galatasaray S.K. footballers
FK Rad players
Yugoslav First League players
Süper Lig players
Yugoslav Second League players
Yugoslav expatriate footballers
Expatriate footballers in Turkey
Yugoslav expatriate sportspeople in Turkey